Towada Audio Corporation is a Japanese manufacturer of radio, television broadcasting and communications equipment headquartered in Kosaka, Akita.

Sony models manufactured by Towada Audio
 ICF-801
 ICF-SW7600GR
 ICF-SW77
 XC-73
 XC-75
 AC-VQ850

Gallery

Akita's Aiwa
Towada Audio obtained rights from Sony to use the Aiwa brand name and established a new company called Aiwa in 2017.

References

Japanese brands
Electronics companies established in 1974
Japanese companies established in 1974
Audio equipment manufacturers of Japan
Companies based in Akita Prefecture
History of radio
Kosaka, Akita
Portable audio player manufacturers
Sony